(Karl Friedrich) Paul Ernst (7 March 1866, Elbingerode, Kingdom of Hanover – 13 May 1933, aged 67) was a German writer, dramatist, critic and journalist.

Works

Novels

Der schmale Weg zum Glück
Das Glück von Lautenthal
Der Schatz im Morgenbrotstal
Saat auf Hoffnung

Novellas and stories

Der Tod des Cosimo
Komödianten- und Spitzbubengeschichten
Die Hochzeit

Drama

Demetrios
Ariadne auf Naxos
Canossa
Brunhild
Zwei Weiber
Would-be Hamlet
Der Erbe
Die Verlobung
Das Kind der Polizei
Des Adels Stolz
Die Äbtissin von Jouarre
Der Sterbende

Essays

Der Weg zur Form
Zusammenbruch des Idealismus(1918), (1931)
Zusammenbruch des Marxismus (1919)
Grundlagen der neuen Gesellschaft

External links
 Paul Ernst Society (German)
 
 

1866 births
1933 deaths
People from Oberharz am Brocken
People from the Kingdom of Hanover
German male dramatists and playwrights
19th-century German dramatists and playwrights
19th-century German male writers
20th-century German dramatists and playwrights